Sladojevo Kopito is a village in the municipality of Danilovgrad, Montenegro. It is located just south of Danilovgrad.

Demographics
According to the 2011 census, its population was 654.

References

Populated places in Danilovgrad Municipality